The discography of American comedy metal band Steel Panther consists of five studio albums, one extended play, two video albums and seventeen singles.

Albums

Studio albums

Extended plays

Video albums

Singles

Other charted songs

Music videos

References

External links
 
 
 

Heavy metal group discographies
Discographies of American artists